Albert Alexandrovich Bakun (russian:Альберт Александрович Бакун) 21 August 1946.Russian painter. Member of art group Hermitage.

Biography
Albert Bakun was born on August 21, 1946, in workers family in Vyborg near Léningrad.

1951-1962: Attended the Fine Arts Studio of Vyborg .

1962-1967: Entered into and graduated from the Tauride (nowadays named after Nicholas Roerich) Leningrad Art School (LAS), the Faculty of Painting and Pedagogy.

1964: Having been referred by the LAS started to work on his own at the State Hermitage Museum . The first work was the analytical interpretation of replica of the Pergamon Altar.

1967-1973: Educated at the Moscow Polygraphic Institute, Faculty of art and Technical Editing, Graphic Artist speciality area.

1968: Class Pedagogue, Alexander Pavlovich Zaytsev, recommended a young artist to Grigory Yakovlevich Dlugach1 for further studies of analytical painting in the State Hermitage.

1969-1998: Became a member of the Hermitage Group, participated in all the exhibitions of the Group in Russia and abroad. Produced 32 analytical replications of the Old Masters of the Hermitage collection.

1993-2012: Continues to study on his own the heritage of the Old Masters at the State Hermitage.

References

1946 births
Living people
Russian painters